Karl William Roberson (born October 4, 1990) is an American  former kickboxer and mixed martial artist who competed in the Middleweight division of the Ultimate Fighting Championship.

Early life and education
Raised in Neptune Township, New Jersey. Roberson played baseball at Neptune High School.

Kickboxing career
Roberson was called on short notice to fight K-1 legend Jérôme Le Banner at Fight Night Saint-Tropez 4 on August 4 in Saint-Tropez on his retirement fight. Although he was making his professional kickboxing debut, with only three amateur fights, he managed to upset Le Banner and score two knockdowns, first was ruled as a slip and during the second the referee proceeded with a slow count about 30 seconds that allowed him to recover, leading the fight to a controversial decision loss.

Mixed martial arts career

Early career
After earning three wins in amateur MMA, Roberson made his professional MMA debut May 2015. He fought sporadically over the next two years, obtaining a record of 5–0.

Dana White's Tuesday Night Contender Series
Roberson appeared in Dana White's Contender Series 3 on July 25, 2017 against Ryan Spann. He won the fight via elbow strikes in round one and he was award the UFC contract.

Ultimate Fighting Championship
He made his debut on November 11, 2017 against Darren Stewart at UFC Fight Night: Poirier vs. Pettis. He won the fight via rear-naked choke submission in the first round.

Roberson faced Cezar Ferreira on May 12, 2018 at UFC 224. He lost the fight via technical submission in the first round.

Roberson faced Jack Marshman on November 3, 2018 at UFC 230. He won the fight via unanimous decision.

Roberson agreed on a short notice fight against Glover Teixeira in the light heavyweight division at UFC Fight Night: Cejudo vs. Dillashaw on January 19, 2019. Roberson replaced Ion Cutelaba in the fight who had to pull out due to an injury. Despite hurting Teixeira with elbows early in the round, Roberson lost the fight in the first round by submission via arm triangle choke.

Roberson was scheduled to meet John Phillips on July 13, 2019 at UFC Fight Night 155. However, it was reported that Phillips was pulled from the bout due to injury and he was replaced by Wellington Turman. Roberson won the fight via a controversial split decision.

Roberson faced promotional newcomer Roman Kopylov on November 9, 2019 at UFC Fight Night 163. He won the fight via a submission in round three.

Roberson was expected to face Makhmud Muradov on April 18, 2020 at UFC 249. However, Muradov was forced to pull from the event due to COVID-19 pandemic travel restriction, and Roberson was pulled from the event and was scheduled to meet Marvin Vettori on April 25, 2020. However, on April 9, Dana White, the president of UFC announced that this event was postponed to a future date Instead Roberson was scheduled to face Marvin Vettori on May 13, 2020 at UFC on ESPN 9. At the weigh-ins Roberson weighed in at 187.5 pounds, 1.5 pounds over the middleweight non-title weight limit of 186 pounds. He was fined 20% of his purse, which was given to opponent Vettori, and the match was to proceed at a catchweight. However, Roberson was removed from the fight due to rhabdomyolysis. The fight was rescheduled to June 13, 2020 at UFC on ESPN: Eye vs. Calvillo. At the weigh-ins on June 12, Roberson once again missed weight, weighing in at 190.5 pounds, 4.5 pounds over the non-title middleweight limit of 186 pounds. The bout proceed as a catchweight bout and Roberson was fined 30% of his purse. He lost the fight via a submission in round one.

Roberson was scheduled to face Dalcha Lungiambula on December 12, 2020 at UFC 256. However, Karl tested positive for COVID-19 and the fight was moved to the next card on December 19, UFC Fight Night: Thompson vs. Neal.

Roberson faced Brendan Allen on April 24, 2021 at UFC 261. He lost the bout via ankle hook submission at the end of the first round.

Roberson was scheduled to face promotional newcomer Nick Maximov on September 25, 2021 at UFC 266. However, due to medical issues Roberson was forced to withdraw from the event and he was replaced by promotional newcomer Cody Brundage.

Roberson faced Khalil Rountree Jr. on March 12, 2022 at UFC Fight Night 203. Roberson lost the bout via TKO in round two.

Roberson faced Kennedy Nzechukwu on July 9, 2022, at UFC on ESPN 39. He lost the fight via technical knockout in round three.

In July 2022, it was announced that Roberson  was no longer on the UFC roster.

Mixed martial arts record

|-
|Loss
|align=center|9–6
|Kennedy Nzechukwu
|TKO (elbows)
|UFC on ESPN: dos Anjos vs. Fiziev
|
|align=center|3
|align=center|2:19
|Las Vegas, Nevada, United States
|
|-
|Loss
|align=center|9–5
|Khalil Rountree Jr.
|TKO (body kick and punches)
|UFC Fight Night: Santos vs. Ankalaev
|
|align=center|2
|align=center|0:25
|Las Vegas, Nevada, United States
|  
|-
|Loss
|align=center|9–4
|Brendan Allen
|Submission (ankle lock)
|UFC 261 
|
|align=center|1
|align=center|4:55
|Jacksonville, Florida, United States
|
|-
|Loss
|align=center|9–3
|Marvin Vettori
|Submission (rear-naked choke)
|UFC on ESPN: Eye vs. Calvillo
|
|align=center|1
|align=center|4:17
|Las Vegas, Nevada, United States
|
|-
|Win
|align=center|9–2
|Roman Kopylov
|Submission (rear-naked choke)
|UFC Fight Night: Magomedsharipov vs. Kattar 
|
|align=center|3
|align=center|4:01
|Moscow, Russia
|
|-
|Win
|align=center|8–2
|Wellington Turman
|Decision (split)
|UFC Fight Night: de Randamie vs. Ladd 
|
|align=center|3
|align=center|5:00
|Sacramento, California, United States
|
|-
|Loss
|align=center|7–2
|Glover Teixeira
|Submission (arm-triangle choke)
|UFC Fight Night: Cejudo vs. Dillashaw 
|
|align=center|1
|align=center|3:21
|Brooklyn, New York, United States
|
|-
|Win
|align=center|7–1
|Jack Marshman
|Decision (unanimous)
|UFC 230 
|
|align=center|3
|align=center|5:00
|New York City, New York, United States
| 
|- 
|Loss
|align=center|6–1
|Cezar Ferreira
|Technical Submission (arm-triangle choke)
|UFC 224
|
|align=center|1
|align=center|4:45
|Rio de Janeiro, Brazil
|
|-
|Win
|align=center|6–0
|Darren Stewart
|Submission (rear-naked choke)
|UFC Fight Night: Poirier vs. Pettis
|
|align=center|1
|align=center|3:41
|Norfolk, Virginia, United States
|
|-
|Win
|align=center|5–0
|Ryan Spann
|KO (elbows)
|Dana White's Contender Series 3
|
|align=center|1
|align=center|0:15
|Las Vegas, Nevada, United States
|
|-
|Win
|align=center|4–0
|Derrick Brown
|Submission (armbar)
|CFFC 65: Brady vs. Saraceno
|
|align=center|1
|align=center|1:01
|Philadelphia, Pennsylvania, United States
|
|-
|Win
|align=center| 3–0
|Elijah Gbollie
|TKO (punches)
|Shogun Fights 16
|
|align=center|1
|align=center|1:50
|Baltimore, Maryland, United States
|
|-
|Win
|align=center|2–0
|Michael Wilcox
|Submission (armbar)
|CFFC 50: Smith vs. Williams
|
|align=center|1
|align=center|3:11
|Atlantic City, New Jersey, United States
|
|-
|Win
|align=center|1–0
|Chike Obi
|Decision (unanimous)
|Ring of Combat 51
|
|align=center|3
|align=center|5:00
|Atlantic City, New Jersey, United States
|
|-

Amateur mixed martial arts record

|Win
|align=center| 3–0
|Lex Ludlow 
|Decision (unanimous)
|Xtreme Caged Combat 19: Bloodshed 
|
|align=center|3
|align=center|2:00
|Philadelphia, USA
|Light Heavyweight bout.
|-
|Win
|align=center| 2–0
|Lex Ludlow 
|TKO (retirement)
|Xtreme Caged Combat: Vendetta
|
|align=center|1
|align=center|2:00
|Philadelphia, USA
|Light Heavyweight bout.
|-
|Win
|align=center| 1–0
|Adam Timberlake
|Decision (unanimous)
|GMMMA: Gold Medal MMA
|
|align=center|3
|align=center|3:00
|Metuchen, USA
|Heavyweight bout.

Kickboxing record

|-  style="background:#fbb;"
| 2016-05-13 || Loss ||align=left| Mike Lemaire || Glory 30: Los Angeles || Ontario, California, USA || Decision (unanimous) || 3 || 3:00 || 0–3
|-  style="background:#fbb;"
| 2016-02-26 || Loss ||align=left| Dustin Jacoby || Glory 27: Chicago, Semi Finals || Hoffman Estates, Illinois, USA || TKO || 3 || 2:56 || 0–2
|-
! style=background:white colspan=9 |
|-  style="background:#fbb;"
| 2015-08-04 || Loss ||align=left| Jérôme Le Banner || Fight Night Saint-Tropez III  || Saint Tropez, France || Decision (unanimous) || 5 || 2:00 || 0–1
|-
! style=background:white colspan=9 |
|-

|-  style="background:#cfc;"
| 2014-02-28 || Win ||align=left| Simon Camaj || Friday Night Fights  || New York City, United States || TKO || 4 || N/A || 2–0
|-  style="background:#cfc;"
| 2013-01-30 || Win ||align=left| Steven Jordan || Friday Night Fights: 2013 Opener  || New York City, United States || KO || 1 || 1:39 || 1–0
|-
| colspan=9 | Legend:

References

External links
 
 

1990 births
Living people
American male mixed martial artists
American male kickboxers
Glory kickboxers
Neptune High School alumni
People from Neptune City, New Jersey
People from Neptune Township, New Jersey
Sportspeople from Monmouth County, New Jersey
Ultimate Fighting Championship male fighters
Light heavyweight mixed martial artists
Middleweight mixed martial artists
Mixed martial artists utilizing kickboxing